Omanosaura is a genus of lizards of the family Lacertidae.

Species
Omanosaura cyanura  — blue-tailed lizard 
Omanosaura jayakari  — Jayakar lizard

References

 
Lizard genera
Taxa named by Wolfgang Bischoff
Taxa named by Werner Mayer (herpetologist)